Great Mariners (previously known as Ghapoha or Ghapoha Readers) is a Ghanaian professional football club based in Tema. They are a currently competing in the Ghana Football Leagues. In 1997, the team won the Ghanaian FA Cup.

History
It was founded in the port city of Tema with the name GHAPOHA, which would later be changed to GHAPOHA Readers. The club's name was an abbreviation of Ghana Port and Harbor Authority (GHAPOHA).

Their first major achievement was winning the Ghanaian FA Cup in the 1996/97 season after beating Okwahu United 1–0 in the final with a goal from Isaac Boakye.  Internationally they won the WAFU Club Championship in 1997 and in the African Football Confederation tournaments they participated in the defunct African Cup Winners' Cup in 1998, in which they were eliminated in the second round by USM Alger of Algeria.

In 2007, the team rebranded and changed their name from Ghapoha to Great Mariners.

Honours

National Tournaments (1) 
 FA Cup: 1

 1997 

 Ghana Super Cup runner-up : 1
 1997

International Tournaments (1) 
 West African Club Championship: 1

 1997

Performance in CAF competitions

 1998 African Cup Winners' Cup: second round

Previous players 

 Category:Ghapoha Readers players

References

External links
Ghapoha Rebrand
GHAPOHA Players Seek New Jobs
Ghana All-Time Table

Football clubs in Ghana
Tema